Haplochromis labiatus is a species of cichlid found in the Democratic Republic of the Congo and Uganda where it is found in Lake Edward and Lake George.  This species can reach a length of  SL.

References

labiatus
Fish described in 1933
Lake fish of Africa
Taxonomy articles created by Polbot